Kepler-68c is an Earth-sized planet orbiting the star Kepler-68 in the constellation of Cygnus. It was discovered by planetary-transit methods by the Kepler space telescope in February 2013. It has a mass of 4.8 times that of Earth (0.015 MJ) and a radius of 0.953 Earth radii. It has an orbital period of 9.605085 days at a distance of about 0.09059 AU from its star. Relatively wide constraints on Kepler-68c's mass are the result lack of detection of the planet through radial-velocity and transit-timing-variation methods.

See also
 List of planets discovered by the Kepler spacecraft

References

Exoplanets discovered in 2013
68c
Cygnus (constellation)
Terrestrial planets
Transiting exoplanets